Stictia is a largely neotropical genus of large, often brightly colored predatory sand wasps, consisting of about 30 species.

List of species (selected) 
 Stictia andrei (Handlirsch, 1890)
 Stictia antiopa (Handlirsch, 1890)
 Stictia arcuata (Gruppe Taschenberg, 1870)
 Stictia carolina (Fabricius, 1793)
 Stictia croceata (Lepeletier, 1845)
 Stictia decemmaculata (Packard, 1869)
 Stictia decorata (Gruppe Taschenberg, 1870)
 Stictia dives (Handlirsch, 1890)
 Stictia flexuosa (Gruppe Taschenberg, 1870)
 Stictia heros (Fabricius, 1804)
 Stictia infracta J.Parker, 1929
 Stictia maccus (Handlirsch, 1895)
 Stictia maculata (Fabricius, 1804)
 Stictia medea (Handlirsch, 1890)
 Stictia megacera Parker
 Stictia mexicana (Handlirsch, 1890)
 Stictia pantherina (Handlirsch, 1890)
 Stictia punctata (Fabricius, 1775)
 Stictia signata (Linnaeus, 1758)
 Stictia sombrana J.Parker, 1929
 Stictia trifasciata J.Parker, 1929
 Stictia vivida (Handlirsch)

References 

Crabronidae
Apoidea genera